was the second of twenty-four  destroyers, built for the Imperial Japanese Navy following World War I. When introduced into service, these ships were the most powerful destroyers in the world. They served as first-line destroyers through the 1930s, and remained formidable weapons systems well into the Pacific War. Shirayuki was sunk in the Battle of the Bismarck Sea on 3 March 1943 while under attack by American and Australian aircraft.

History
Construction of the advanced Fubuki-class destroyers was authorized as part of the Imperial Japanese Navy's expansion program from fiscal 1923, intended to give Japan a qualitative edge with the world's most modern ships. The Fubuki class had performance that was a quantum leap over previous destroyer designs, so much so that they were designated . The large size, powerful engines, high speed, large radius of action and unprecedented armament gave these destroyers the firepower similar to many light cruisers in other navies. Shirayuki, built at the Yokohama Shipyards was laid down on 19 March 1927, launched on 20 March 1928 and commissioned on 18 December 1928. Originally assigned hull designation "Destroyer No. 36", she was completed as Shirayuki, after Emperor Shōwa's favorite white stallion.

Operational history
On completion, Shirayuki was assigned to Destroyer Division 11 under the IJN 2nd Fleet. During the Second Sino-Japanese War, Shirayuki was assigned to patrols of the southern China coast, and participated in the Invasion of French Indochina in 1940.

World War II history
At the time of the attack on Pearl Harbor, Shirayuki was assigned to Destroyer Division 11 of Desron 3 of the IJN 1st Fleet, and had deployed from Kure Naval District to the port of Samah on Hainan Island. From 4 December 1941 through February 1942, Shirayuki covered the landings of Japanese troops in Malaya, Anambas Islands and "Operation B" (the invasion of British Borneo).

In February 1942, Shirayuki was part of the escort for the heavy cruiser  during "Operation L" (the invasion of Banka and Palembang in the Netherlands East Indies), and was credited with sinking or capturing four transports attempting to flee from Singapore.

Shirayuki was subsequently assigned to "Operation J" (the invasion of Java), and was in the Battle of Sunda Strait on 1 March, assisting in the sinking of the Australian cruiser  and the American cruiser . Shirayuki took a shell hit direct to her bridge during the battle, killing one crewman and injuring 11 others.

In early March, Shirayuki escorted a troop convoy from Singapore to Burma, and participated in "Operation D", the invasion of the Andaman Islands on 23 March. During the Indian Ocean raids, Shirayuki was assigned to patrols out of Port Blair. From 13–22 April, Shirayuki returned via Singapore and Camranh Bay to Kure Naval Arsenal, for maintenance.

On 4–5 June, Shirayuki participated in the Battle of Midway as part of Admiral Isoroku Yamamoto's main fleet. In July 1942, Shirayuki sailed from Amami-Oshima to Mako Guard District, Singapore, Sabang and Mergui for a projected second Indian Ocean raid. The operation was cancelled due to the Guadalcanal campaign, and she was ordered to Truk and Rabaul instead. From August through November, Shirayuki was used for numerous "Tokyo Express" high speed transport missions in the Solomon Islands. On 12 October, she rescued the survivors of her sister ship , which had been torpedoed.

On 14–15 November, Shirayuki was involved in the Second Naval Battle of Guadalcanal. She was initially attached to Admiral Kurita’s support force, and then joined Admiral Kondo’s emergency bombardment force. Together with the light cruiser , Shirayuki assisted in sinking two of the four American destroyers involved ( and ) mortally wounding  (which was scuttled after the battle), and severely damaged , causing heavy American losses in the first phase of the battle.

Shirayuki returned briefly to Kure at the end of the year, as escort for the aircraft carrier .

In January 1943, Shirayuki returned to the Solomon Islands as part of a major reinforcement convoy from Shanghai, arriving with Rear Admiral Shintarō Hashimoto at Shortland Island at the end of January, and serving as the admiral’s flagship during the evacuation of Guadalcanal in February. Shirayuki was reassigned to the IJN 8th Fleet on 25 February .

During the Battle of the Bismarck Sea on 1–4 March, Shirayuki was flagship for Rear Admiral Masatomi Kimura, leading a troop convoy from Rabaul to Lae. In an Allied air attack on 3 March, a skip-bomb exploded in her aft magazine, severing her stern, and killing 32 crewmen.

On 1 April 1943, Shirayuki was removed from the navy list.

Notes

References

External links

Fubuki-class destroyers
Ships built in Japan
1928 ships
Second Sino-Japanese War naval ships of Japan
World War II destroyers of Japan
Destroyers sunk by aircraft
Shipwrecks in the Bismarck Sea
World War II shipwrecks in the Pacific Ocean
Maritime incidents in March 1943
Naval magazine explosions